Presidential elections were held in Mauritania on 22 June 2019, with a second round planned for 6 July if no candidate had received more than 50% of the vote. The result was a first round victory for Mohamed Ould Ghazouani who won with 52 percent of the vote. However, opposition rejected the results, calling it "another army coup." On 1 July 2019, Mauritania's constitutional council confirmed Ghazouani as president and rejected a challenge by opposition.

With incumbent President Mohamed Ould Abdel Aziz not running, the elections were reported to be the first peaceful transfer of power since the country's independence from France in 1960.

Electoral system
Under Article 26 of the constitution, the president is elected for a five-year term using the two round system. If no candidate receives an absolute majority of the vote in the first round, a second round is held two weeks later between the two candidates who received the most votes.

Candidacy is restricted to citizens by birth aged between 40 and 75 (on the day of the first round) who have not had their civil and political rights removed. Article 23 also stipulates that the president has to be a Muslim. Article 28 establishes a term limit of two mandates, allowing the president to only be re-elected once.

The election of a new president is required to take place between 30 and 45 days before the expiration of the term of the incumbent president.

Candidates
Mohamed Ould Ghazouani, Union for the Republic.
Sidi Mohamed Ould Boubacar, supported by Tewassoul.
Biram Dah Abeid, Independent.
Mohamed Ould Maouloud, Union of the Forces of Progress, supported by the Rally of Democratic Forces.
Kane Hamidou Baba, Independent, supported by the Vivre Ensemble coalition.
Mohamed Lemine El Mourteji El Wafi, Independent.

Campaign

Candidate slogans

Opinion polls

Results

Aftermath
Following Ould Ghazouani's declaration of victory, protests were held in Nouakchott, leading to around 100 arrests. The government started to reduce mobile internet services on the day after the elections, with fixed-line internet services ceasing on 25 June; both were fully restored on 3 July.

References

Mauritania
Presidential
Presidential elections in Mauritania
Mauritania
2010s internet outages